Edward Joseph Price is an American politician. He served as a Democratic member for the 58th district of the Louisiana House of Representatives, and is currently a member for the 2nd district of the Louisiana State Senate.

Price attended Grambling State University, where he earned a Bachelor of Arts degree in 1975. In 2012, he was elected for the 58th district of the Louisiana House of Representatives, succeeding Elton M. Aubert. In 2017, he was succeeded by Ken Brass and elected to the Louisiana State Senate, succeeding Troy E. Brown for the 2nd district. He assumed his office on June 16, 2017.

References 

Living people
Place of birth missing (living people)
Year of birth missing (living people)
Democratic Party Louisiana state senators
Democratic Party members of the Louisiana House of Representatives
21st-century American politicians
Grambling State University alumni